Tiesenhausen is the name of a Baltic German nobility family. The origins of the family are in Lower Saxony. During the Baltic crusades they settled in Livonia in the first half of the 12th century. Bishops Albert of Riga and Herman of Tartu had a sister whose husband Engelbertus de Tisenhuse was the progenitor of the family in the Baltic. After some time in southern Livonia in the early stages of occupation, Engelbertus joined his brother-in-law bishop Herman to obtain the northern Livonian country of Ugaunia around Otepää and Tartu. It was Ugaunia where the family held its main early properties and positions. Engelbertus' son married a daughter of the castellan of Koknese in Latgale and through this marriage, the family claims descent from indigenous princes of the Latgalians. Some branches of Tisenhusen clan settled later to the Latvian Vidzeme holdings of Ergli and Berzaune. From the ancestral place of Ugaunia, sons of the family managed to obtain estates in other parts of Estonia, also so-called Danish Estonia and Osilia-Rotalia, both by services and by marriages. (Raplamaa was apparently a favorite place in northern Estonia for them to obtain estates.)

In Livonia they became one of the wealthiest and most important noble lineages between the 14th and 16th centuries. During the changeful history of Livonia several members of the family served under various suzerains, first under the Livonian Brothers of the Sword and the Teutonic Knights and later in Polish–Lithuanian Commonwealth ("Tyzenhauz"), Swedish and Tsarist Russian ("Тизенгаузен") service.

Notable members
Ferdinand von Tiesenhausen (1782–1805), Russian military officer whose death in Austerlitz inspired Tolstoi's character Andrei Bolkonsky in War and Peace
Dorothea von Tiesenhausen (1804–1863), Countess de Ficquelmont by marriage, famous for her letter-writing telling her life as a high society aristocrat in 19th century's Europe
Gerhard von Tiesenhausen (1878–1917), Baltic-German architect in Russia
Hans-Diedrich von Tiesenhausen (1913–2000), U-boat captain
Georg von Tiesenhausen (1914–2018), German-American rocket scientist.

Estates

Rapla Manor (Rappel), in Rapla, Estonia 
Alu Manor (Allo), near Rapla
Valtu Manor (Waldau), near Rapla (was destroyed during the Revolution of 1905)
Hertu Manor (Hermet), near Rapla
Castle of Fall (Schloß Fall), in Keila-Joa, Estonia
Sausti Manor (Groß-Sauß), Estonia
Rokiškis Manor (Rokischken Castle), in Rokiškis, Lithuania (see picture above)
Lubeja Manor (Gut Lubey), Latvia

References

External links 
 Genealogic Handbook of the Baltic Knighthoods, 1930

German noble families
Lower Saxon nobility
Swedish nobility
Swedish people of German descent
Baltic-German people
Russian nobility